The Caparaó grass mouse (Akodon mystax) is a rodent species from South America. It is found in Brazil.

References

Mammals of Brazil
Akodon
Mammals described in 1998
Taxa named by Philip Hershkovitz